Coombs Lake is a lake in Meeker County, in the U.S. state of Minnesota.

Coombs Lake was named for Vincent Coombs, a pioneer who settled there.

See also
List of lakes in Minnesota

References

Lakes of Minnesota
Lakes of Meeker County, Minnesota